HMS St George was a hulk at Harwich bought in 1701 from M. Stevens; she was sunk on 20 February 1716 as a foundation for Chatham Dockyard.

Citations and references
Citations

References
 
 

1700s ships
Ships of the Royal Navy